Musiccream (also stylized as Music Cream) is a Thai record label and a subsidiary of GMM Grammy that focuses on pop music genre.

Roster

Current acts 
  and  –
 Pongsak Rattanapong (Aof)
 Rhatha Phongam (Ying)
  (Kacha)
 
 Tatchapol Thitiapichai (Tanthai) and Phongnarong Jingjamikorn (Ponjang) – (Ampersand)
 Thanasit Jaturaput (Ton)

Former acts 
  (Bua)
  (Dao)
  (Nana) for "Episode II อาคันตุก๊ะ" album
 Potato for "Go...On", "Life" and "Sense" albums
 Katreeya English for "Siamese Kat", "Lucky Girl" and "Sassy K" albums
  (Kal)
 Lanna Commins
 Palmy for "Beautiful Ride" album
  for "Ozone" album
  (Oak)
  (Beau)
 Auttapon Prakopkong (M)
 Muanpair Panaboot (Ging)
  (Punch)
 Kanist Piyapaphakornkoon (Teng)
 Nat Sakdatorn
 Arunpong Chaiwinit (Dew)

References

External links 

GMM Grammy
Thai record labels
Pop record labels